Daniel G. Huberty (June 21, 1968) is an American businessman, who was a Republican member of the Texas House of Representatives for District 127 in Harris County from 2011 to 2023.

Huberty ran unopposed for his third term in the state House in the general election on November 4, 2014. and won again for his fourth term in the Republican primary held on March 1, 2016.

Early life, education, and career
Huberty is a native of Parma, Ohio, a suburb south of Cleveland. In 1991, he received a Bachelor of Business Administration degree from Cleveland State University in downtown Cleveland. In 1998, he received a Master of Business Administration degree from the University of Phoenix. He currently serves as President and Chief Operating Officer of The Parking REIT, a real estate investment trust where he works to acquire income-producing parking assets. Previously he was an executive with a parking company; before that, a natural gas fueling company.

On April 23, 2021, Huberty was arrested for driving under the influence in Montgomery County, after crashing his vehicle into another car and failing a sobriety test. He later bonded out after the arrest and on the following day released an apology and said he would seek treatment for alcohol addiction.

Political life

Representative Dan Huberty, from Humble, Texas, was first elected in 2011.

During the 86th legislative Session, saw Huberty serve his second term as Chairman of the House Committee on Public Education as well as serving on the House Committee on County Affairs. He authored 12 bills which were signed by the Governor including House Bill 3 one of the most transformative Texas education bills in recent history and has been recognized for his legislative efforts by the Texas Association of Community Schools, Education in Action, Texas Public Interest Group, Environment Texas, The Texas Realtors, and others.

In 2016, Huberty was challenged in the Republican primary by Mitchell Bosworth. Huberty eventually defeated Bosworth, 78% to 22%. Huberty defeated challengers from the Libertarian Party and Green Party in the 2016 General Election, taking 82% of the vote.

In the general election held on November 6, 2018, Huberty handily won his fifth legislative term. With 44,550 votes (80.3 percent), he defeated the Libertarian choice, Ryan Woods, who polled 10,964 (19.7 percent). No Democrat sought the position.

Huberty currently serves on the (1) Licensing and Administrative Procedures and (2) Public Education committees.

Legislative History 

87th Legislative Session (and 1st, 2nd & 3rd Called Special Sessions)

•Authored and passed legislation to direct the further implementation of HB3 (86R) to further public school finance reforms

•Authored and passed legislation to direct the spending of billions of dollars in federal funding

•Authored and passed legislation to limit liabilities on property owners & managers

•Authored and passed legislation to reward school districts for making students Military Ready

•Authored and passed legislation to further the implementation of standardized testing and accountability reforms

•Authored and passed legislation to increase high school graduation rates

•Secured an additional $50 million for the continued dredging of Lake Houston

•Authored and passed legislation to make districts accountable after failing to meet standardsref></ref>

•Filed 25 separate pieces of legislation ranging in issues from APO monitoring to sports betting

•Authored and passed legislation to remedy issues that arose for school districts from the implementation of legislation passed in the regular session

86th Legislative Session

•Re-Appointed as Chairman of the House Committee on Public Education 
•The Public Education Committee was referred 20% more bills than Ways & Means
•The Public Education Committee heard over 300 bills, reporting more than 250 out of committee

•Authored and passed House Bill 3, The Texas Plan, the transformational public school finance form in Texas

•Instituted $4.5 billion in Education Reforms

•Provided more than $5 billion in Property Tax Relief

•Reduced Recapture statewide by $3.6 billion

•Authored and passed legislation to protect UIL student-athletes from Sudden Cardiac Arrest. HB 76 was named the Cody Stephens Law in honor of a Crosby High School football player who died unexpectedly from an undetected cardiac issue.

•Secured $30 million of the statewide budget for a dedicated dredging program in Lake Houston

•Authored and passed legislation to increase inspections and penalties on APOs

•Authored and passed legislation to protect the flood victims from identity thieves

•Authored and passed legislation to exempt disabled firefighters from tuition for new skills

•Authored and passed legislation to save taxpayer dollars by allowing unsold property to be resold

•Authored and passed legislation to exempt Volunteer Fire Departments from fuel sales tax

•Filed 36 separate pieces of legislation on issues ranging from education reform to flood recovery

85th Legislative Session

•Appointed as Chairman of the House Committee on Public Education and passed 85 bills

•Authored and passed legislation restricting municipal annexation by requiring approval of property owners

•Authored and passed legislation reforming the school finance system, providing $311 million

•Authored and passed legislation addressing the public school accountability system

84th Legislative Session

•Authored and passed legislation on Gov. Abbott's number one emergency item, pre-K

•Authored and passed legislation to prohibit cities or counties from unfairly mandating that rental property owners accept government housing vouchers

•Authored and passed legislation to eliminate an existing double-taxation on small businesses who choose to use Professional Employment Organizations

•Authored and passed legislation to ease the process for contractors when bidding for projects that require a certain construction consolidated insurance plan

83rd Legislative Session (and 1st, 2nd, and 3rd Called Special Sessions)

•Authored and passed legislation to effectively ban the use of Common Core in Texas

•Authored and passed legislation to encourage co-generation agreements between multiple companies to help address Texas' resource adequacy issues

•Authored and passed legislation to allow E-filing for County elected officials

•Authored and passed legislation to allow students to "test out" of some standardized exams to ease the burden on Texas' school children

82nd Legislative Session (and 1st Called Special Session)

•Authored and passed legislation to regulate illegal aggregate production operators (APOs) to weed out the bad actors and improve water quality

•Worked with Senator Tommy Williams to return $9 Million in TIRZ funds for Humble ISD

Texas House District 127 Election History

General Election 2020 
Defeated the Libertarian Opponent with 70.3% of the vote

Primary Election 2020 
Defeated the Republican Opponent with 81.9% of the vote

General Election 2018 
Defeated the Libertarian Opponent with 80.2% of the vote

Primary Election 2018 
Defeated the Republican Opponent with 82.9% of the vote

General Election 2016 
Defeated both the Libertarian & Green Party Opponents with 81.9% of the vote

Primary Election 2016 
Defeated the Republican Opponent with 77.8% of the vote

General Election 2014 
Ran Unopposed

Primary Election 2014 
Ran Unopposed

General Election 2012 
Defeated the Democratic Opponent with 70.22% of the vote

Primary Election 2012 
Defeated the Republican Opponent with 90.25% of the vote

General Election 2010 
Defeated the Democratic Opponent with 75.25% of the vote

Primary Run-Off Election 2010 
Defeated the Republican Run-Off Opponent with 70.24% of the vote

Primary Election 2010 
Among four candidates, received 48.74% of the vote to go into the Run-Off

Awards 
•2021 Texas Public Charter School Association Charter School Champion

•2021 Friends of Texas Public Schools Founders Distinguished Service Award

•2020 TLR Civil Justice Leadership Award

•2019 Lake Houston Area Chamber of Commerce - "Spirit of Commerce" Award

•2019 Conservative Roundtable of Texas Exemplary Conservative & Effective Conservative

•2019 Texas Business Leadership Council Woody L. Hunt Legislative Leadership Award

•2019 Texas PTA Legislative Advocate of the Year

•2019 Building Owner's & Manager's Association President's Award

•2019 CLEAT - Best of the House Award

•2019 Texas Association of Community Schools Distinguished Service Award

•2019 Texas Computer Education Association Friend of Education Award

•2019 Capitol Inside - Top Texas Legislators

•2018 Texas Classroom Teachers Association Friend of Education Award

•2018 TEPSA Sandi Borden "Tribute to Texas Children" Award

•2017 Academic Language Therapy Association - Champion for Children Award

•2017 Capitol Inside - Top Texas House Floor Fighters

•2017 Texas Monthly - Top 10 Best Legislators

•2017 Fastgrowth School Coalition -  Legislator Appreciation Award

•2017 Texas School Public Relations Association - Key Communicator

•2015 Lake Houston Area Chamber of Commerce - Haden McKay, MD Citizen of the Year Award

•2015 Capitol Inside - Top Texas House Member

•2015 Houston Apartment Association - Distinguished Service Award

•2015 Associated Builders and Contractors - Free Enterprise Champion Award

•2015 Texas Association of Business - Champion for Free Enterprise

•2015 Texas Association for the Education of Young Children - Elected Official of the Year Award

•2015 CLEAT - Best of the House Award

•2013 Texas PTA Legislative Honor Roll

•2013 Texas Association of Business - Champion for Free Enterprise

•2013 CLEAT - Best of the House Award

•2013 Texas Combined Heating and Power Initiative - CHP Policy Champion

•2013 Harris County Medical Society - Patient Care Champion

•2013 Texas Conservative Roundtable - Lone Star Conservative Leader Award

•2013 Texas Association of Business - Fighter for Free Enterprise Champion

•2011 Texas Monthly - Rookie of the Year

•2011 Texas Association of Business -  Fighter for Free Enterprise Champion

•2011 Texas Conservative Roundtable - Lone Star Conservative Leader Award

•2011 Texas Council of Administrators of Special Education - Legislator of the Year Award

•2011 Academic Language Therapy Association - Champion for Children Award

Personal life 

Huberty and his wife, the former Janet Marie Etterman, have three children. They are members of the Saint Martha's Roman Catholic Church parish in Kingwood/Porter, Texas.

References

External links
 

1968 births
Living people
People from Parma, Ohio
People from Houston
People from Humble, Texas
School board members in Texas
Republican Party members of the Texas House of Representatives
Businesspeople from Texas
Cleveland State University alumni
University of Phoenix alumni
21st-century American politicians
Catholics from Texas
Catholics from Ohio
Catholics from Arizona